Spinas railway station is a railway station at the south portal of the Albula Tunnel in the municipality of Bever, in the Swiss canton of Graubünden. It is located on the  Albula line of the Rhaetian Railway. Services operate every two hours to this station.

Services
The following services stop at Spinas:

 Regio: limited service between Chur and St. Moritz.

References

External links
 
 

Railway stations in Graubünden
Rhaetian Railway stations
Railway stations in Switzerland opened in 1903